Richard Willis Jameson (12 July 1851 – 21 February 1899) was a Canadian politician who served as an alderman and 15th Mayor of Winnipeg, and as a Member of the House of Commons of Canada.

Born in Cape Town, Jameson was educated in the United Kingdom. He graduated from Trinity College, Cambridge after attending King's College London. He moved to Canada in 1876, first practicing law in Toronto, and received his admission to the bar in Ontario the following year. He moved to Winnipeg in 1881 to conduct land speculation at a time when that city's economy enjoyed considerable growth. He was inducted into Manitoba's provincial bar in 1882.

Following terms as Winnipeg alderman starting in 1892, Jameson was elected the city's Mayor for 1896.

After the federal election results for the Winnipeg riding were annulled in March 1897, Jameson entered a by-election as a Liberal candidate. He won the riding on 27 April 1897 and served for a portion of the 8th Canadian Parliament. However, Jameson died from a self-inflicted gunshot wound on 21 February 1899 shortly after presenting a speech to the Winnipeg Board of Trade. An investigation concluded that his death was not suicidal but accidental in nature.

Winnipeg named Jamison Avenue  in his honour.

References

External links
 
 

1851 births
1899 deaths
Alumni of Trinity College, Cambridge
Alumni of King's College London
British expatriates in Canada
Deaths by firearm in Manitoba
Liberal Party of Canada MPs
Lawyers in Manitoba
Mayors of Winnipeg
Members of the House of Commons of Canada from Manitoba
Lawyers in Ontario
Politicians from Cape Town
Cape Colony people
South African expatriates in the United Kingdom
Accidental deaths in Manitoba
Firearm accident victims